Vrapci is a village in the municipality of Sokolac, Bosnia and Herzegovina.

Notable people
Halid Bešlić, folk singer born on 20 November 1953, in Vrapci near Knežina.

References

Populated places in Sokolac